The 1999–2000 Boston Bruins season was the team's 76th season of operation. The Bruins failed to qualify for the 2000 Stanley Cup playoffs for the first time in the expansion era, ending a 29-year playoff streak which remains (as of 2022) the longest in North American major professional sport.

Off-season
Following a second-round loss to the Buffalo Sabres the year previous, the Bruins headed into the 1999–2000 season with confidence that they could reach the playoffs for the third straight year under head coach Pat Burns. General manager Harry Sinden signed no free agents in the offseason and made no significant moves heading into the season. Goaltender Byron Dafoe was to be the starter for the third straight year following his best season in 1998–99, going 32–23–11 with a .926 save percentage.

Regular season
On February 21, 2000, Marty McSorley, playing for the Bruins, swung his stick and hit Donald Brashear in the head with seconds left in the Bruins-Vancouver Canucks game.  Brashear lost consciousness and suffered a grade 3 concussion, but not from immediate contact with the stick. The stick hit Brashear's helmet, but caused him to fall backward, and his head hit hard on the ice.

As a result of the stick incident, McSorley was charged with assault and suspended by the NHL for the remainder of the 1999–2000 season (including playoffs) missing 23 games. On October 4, 2000, a jury found McSorley guilty of assault with a weapon for his attack on Brashear. He was sentenced to 18 months probation. The trial was the first for an on-ice attack by an NHL player since 1988. After his assault conviction, his NHL suspension was extended to one full year (through February 21, 2001). This suspension was the longest in NHL history and afterwards McSorley never played in another NHL game.

During the regular season, the Bruins were the only team not to score a short-handed goal.

Final standings

Schedule and results

Player statistics

Regular season
Scoring

Goaltending

Awards and records

Records

Milestones

Transactions

Trades

Free agents

Signings

Waivers

Retirement

Draft picks
Boston's draft picks at the 1999 NHL Entry Draft held at the FleetCenter in Boston, Massachusetts.

Notes
 The Bruins acquired this pick as the result of a trade on June 27, 1998 that sent a ninth-round pick in 1998 to the New York Islanders in exchange for this pick.

References

Boston Bruins
Boston Bruins
Boston Bruins seasons
Boston Bruins
Boston Bruins
Bruins
Bruins